Francis Xavier Thomas (28 March 1906 – 5 August 1985) was an Australian Roman Catholic bishop.

Ordained to the priesthood on 13 July 1930, Thomas was named bishop of the Roman Catholic Diocese of Geraldton, Australia in 1962 and retired in 1981.

References 

1906 births
1985 deaths
People from Bendigo
20th-century Roman Catholic bishops in Australia
Roman Catholic bishops of Geraldton